The 1967 CONCACAF Championship, also referred to as the NORCECA Championship, was the third edition of the CONCACAF Championship. The final tournament took place from 5 to 19 March in Tegucigalpa, Honduras.

Mexico qualified automatically as defending champions, while Honduras did it as the host nation. Guatemala won the title after finishing in first place of a round-robin tournament between the six teams participating in the final tournament. It is the only CONCACAF championship won to date by Guatemala, who was managed by Rubén Amorín.

Mexico, managed by Ignacio "Nacho" Trelles, finished second, while Honduras finished third.

Qualifying tournaments

Venues

Final tournament

Final standings

Matches

See also
CONCACAF Gold Cup

References

External links
RSSSF – III. CONCACAF NATIONS CUP 1967
Source for Mexico matches data (unless otherwise indicated): RSSSF – Mexico – International Results Details 1960–1969

 
CONCACAF Championship
International association football competitions hosted by Honduras
Championship
1966–67 in Mexican football
1966–67 in Honduran football
1966–67 in Guatemalan football
1966–67 in Nicaraguan football
1967 in Haiti
Sports competitions in Tegucigalpa
March 1967 sports events in North America
20th century in Tegucigalpa